The Austin Loadstar is a British light truck that was built by Austin during the 1950s.

The 1 ton truck was available in either drop sided or flatbed models. It was the first Austin truck to be designed after World War II and was sold in the United Kingdom, Australia, New Zealand, Scandinavia and Uruguay and British Colonies of West, East and Southern Africa. The Mk III, which was introduced in 1956, had a redesigned front end and interior.

K9 variant

A military 4x4 variant known as the K9 was also produced and was used for several purposes including an ambulance, water carrier, recovery vehicle and radio truck. The military version often had a round hatch in the cab roof for defensive and observation purposes.

External links 
 Austin K9 Register
 Austin Loadstar at the Internet Movie Cars Database

Loadstar
Trucks